Aliyar is one of the tributaries of the river Kannadipuzha. Kannadipuzha is one of the main  tributaries of the river Bharathapuzha, the second-longest river in Kerala, south India. Its source is the Aliyar dam in Aliyar near Pollachi in Tamil Nadu

See also 
Bharathapuzha - Main river
Kannadipuzha - One of the main  tributaries of the river Bharathapuzha
Other tributaries of the river Kannadipuzha:
 Palar
 Aliyar
 Uppar

Rivers of Palakkad district
Bharathappuzha